Lakeville is a Canadian community, located in Westmorland County, New Brunswick. The community is situated in southeastern New Brunswick, to the east of Moncton, at the intersection of New Brunswick Route 2 and New Brunswick Route 134. Lakeville is located mainly on Route 134.

History

Places of note
 Lakeville United Church (former Methodist Church)  built in 1879 
Lakeside Golf & Country Club.
 Lakeside Estates (Mini Home Park)
Auberge Wild Rose Inn http://wildroseinn.com

Bordering communities

Notable people

See also
List of communities in New Brunswick

References

Communities in Greater Moncton
Communities in Westmorland County, New Brunswick